But-2-ene is an acyclic alkene with four carbon atoms. It is the simplest alkene exhibiting cis/trans-isomerism (also known as (E/Z)-isomerism); that is, it exists as two geometric isomers cis-but-2-ene ((Z)-but-2-ene) and trans-but-2-ene ((E)-but-2-ene).

It is a petrochemical, produced by the catalytic cracking of crude oil or the dimerization of ethylene. Its main uses are in the production of gasoline (petrol) and butadiene, although some but-2-ene is also used to produce the solvent butanone via hydration to 2-butanol followed by oxidation.

The two isomers are extremely difficult to separate by distillation because of the proximity of their boiling points (~4 °C for cis and ~1 °C for trans). However, separation is unnecessary in most industrial settings, as both isomers behave similarly in most of the desired reactions. A typical industrial but-2-ene mixture is 70% (Z)-but-2-ene (cis-isomer) and 30% (E)-but-2-ene (trans-isomer). Butane and but-1-ene are common impurities, present at 1% or more in industrial mixtures, which also contain smaller amounts of isobutene, butadiene and butyne.

References

External links

Alkenes